Hillbrook School is an independent, accredited, co-educational JK-8 day school in Los Gatos, California, founded in 1935.

History
Hillbrook, originally known as the Children's Country School, was founded by Mary Orem, Elizabeth Glassford, Nathalie Wollin, and Ann Boge. Hillbrook once extended as far as Shannon and Kennedy Roads to the North and South, but the property has since been subdivided to create the current  campus. Their school motto is “Be Kind. Be Curious. Take Risks. Be Your Best.”

A boarding school during its earliest years, Hillbrook became a day school in 1960, at which point the TCCS name was dropped. Robin Clements was headmaster from 1976–97, followed by Sarah Bayne from 1999-2009, with an interim headmaster serving in 1998.

There are 383 students in junior kindergarten through 8th grade in the 2018-19 school year. Mark Silver was appointed as current Head of School in 2009. Silver was recruited from Francis Parker School in San Diego, California.

References

External links
 

Private elementary schools in California
Private middle schools in California
Los Gatos, California
Schools in Santa Clara County, California
Educational institutions established in 1935
1935 establishments in California